Annika Evaldsson (born 14 May 1970 in Åsarna, Sweden) is a Swedish cross-country skier who competed from 1992 to 2002. Her best World Cup finish was seventh in a sprint event in Sunne, Sweden on 11 March 1997.

At the 1994 Winter Olympics in Lillehammer, Evaldsson finished 25th in the 5 km and 29th in both the 5 km + 10 km combined pursuit and the 15 km events. Her best finish at the FIS Nordic World Ski Championships was 14th in the 5 km event at Trondheim in 1997.

During Swedish national championships she won the 5 km event in 1996 and 1997 and the sprint event in the year 2000. She was also part of Sollefteå SK's 3 × 5 kilometers relay-winning team in 1994 and 1995. In the year 2000, she won Tjejvasan.

Cross-country skiing results
All results are sourced from the International Ski Federation (FIS).

Olympic Games

World Championships

World Cup

Season standings

References

External links

1970 births
Living people
People from Berg Municipality
Cross-country skiers from Jämtland County
Cross-country skiers at the 1994 Winter Olympics
Olympic cross-country skiers of Sweden
Swedish female cross-country skiers
IFK Mora skiers